1200s may refer to:

 The century from 1200 to 1299, almost synonymous with the 13th century (1201–1300).
 1200s (decade), the period from 1200 to 1209

See also
 1200s BC (decade) 
 1200s BC (century)
 1200 (disambiguation)